Kemp Independent School District is a public school district based in Kemp, Texas (USA).

In addition to Kemp, the district serves southern Kaufman County and northwest Henderson County, including parts of Seven Points.

In 2009, the school district was rated "academically acceptable" by the Texas Education Agency.

Schools
 Kemp High (Grades 9-12)
 Kemp Junior High (Grades 6-8)
 Kemp Intermediate (Grades 3-5)
 Kemp Primary (Grades PK-2)

Facilities
Kemp ISD owns and operates several support, fine arts and athletic facilities.
 Kemp High School Campus Facilities
 Library
 Fine Arts wing, including a 650-seat auditorium
 Band Hall with practice rooms, music library, office, and ensemble room
 Jacket Stadium featuring a turf field, an all-weather track and metal stands
 Baseball Stadium featuring a grass field, dugouts, and metal stands
 Gymnasium
 Athletic team and Band practice fields
 Shot-put/Discus Pens
 Kemp Jr. High School Campus Facilities
 Cafetorium - a small auditorium used for numerous community events and daily lunch periods
 Gymnasium
 Library
 Kemp Intermediate School and Administration Campus Facilities
 Basketball Courts
 Gymnasium
 Board Room
 Kemp Primary School
 Playground
 Library
 "Old 40" Support Facilities
 Kemp ISD Transportation
 Kemp ISD Maintenance

Traditions
 Colors: Orange and White (grey or black accents also occasionally used)
 Mascot: Yellow Jackets
 Mascot Name: Herbie

Kemp Homecoming has been held once every four years since 1956. It is known to be the largest event in the community, with thousands of visitors and alumni visiting Kemp during Homecoming weekend. Festivities include class reunions, alumni dinners, a parade, athletic events, and street dances. Many in the community, including students, have proposed a traditional annual Homecoming event for the students while keeping the alumni festivities a quad-annual event.

References

External links
 

School districts in Kaufman County, Texas
School districts in Henderson County, Texas